Falco or Falcó is the surname of:

 Albert Falco (1927–2012), diving companion of Jacques Cousteau, chief diver and later captain of the RV Calypso
 Carlos Falcó, 5th Marquess of Griñón (1937–2020), Spanish noble
 Charles M. Falco (born 1948), American experimental physicist
 Domenico Falco (born 1985), Italian footballer
 Edie Falco (born 1963), American actress
 Filippo Falco (born 1992), Italian footballer
 Hubert Falco (born 1947), French politician
 Louis Falco (1942–1993), American dancer and choreographer
 Luis Falcó (1949–2007), Argentine physician and politician
 Manolo Falcó (born 1964), Spanish banker and 13th Marquess of Castel-Moncayo
 Mathea Falco (born 1944), expert in drug abuse prevention and treatment
 Mark Falco (born 1960), English former footballer
 Randy Falco (born 1953), CEO of Univision Communications
 Robert Falco (1882–1960), a French judge at the Nuremberg trials
 David Berkowitz, serial killer, born Richard David Falco in 1953
 Tav Falco (born 1945), musician

Italian-language surnames